Play of the Month is a BBC television anthology series, which ran from 1965 to 1983 featuring productions of classic and contemporary stage plays (or adaptations) which were usually broadcast on BBC1. Each production featured a different work, often using prominent British stage actors in the leading roles. The series was transmitted regularly from October 1965 to May 1979, before returning for the summer seasons of 1982 and 1983. The producer most associated with the Play of the Month series was Cedric Messina. Thirteen productions were also shown previously or subsequently on BBC2 in the period 1971-73 under Stage 2. Productions were broadcast in colour from November 1969.

Of the 128 productions, 40 are missing from the archives (except for short sequences in several cases), having been junked in the 1960s and 1970s. One colour production exists only as a black & white telerecording.

Productions
Sourced according to the BBC Genome archive of Radio Times magazines, with archival status from TV Brain.

Legend: AS/A = Archive status/Availability
Abbreviations: tr =Telerecording; seq = sequence(s)

{| class="wikitable sortable" style="text-align:left;"
|-
! UKTransmissiondate
! Title
! Author
! Producer
! Director
! class="unsortable" | Performers(non-exhaustive)
! class="unsortable" | Notes
! AS/A
|-
! colspan="8" data-sort-value="ZZ" |Series One
|- id="Luther"
|
|Luther
|
|
|
|Alec McCowen,Patrick Magee,Geoffrey Bayldon,Ray Barrett,Jerold Wells,Philip Stone,Fulton Mackay,James Cairncross,Douglas Ditta,Peter Purves,Rex Robinson
|Adapted from the play.
|Survives
|- id="A Passage to India"
|
|data-sort-value="Passage to India, A"|A Passage to India
| (novel);Santha Rama Rau (play);John Maynard (adaptation)
|
|
|Sybil Thorndike,Virginia McKenna;Zia Mohyeddin,Cyril CusackIshaq Bux,Saeed Jaffrey,John Bryans,Doreen Mantle
|Adapted from the play of the novel. Repeated on BBC2 29 Jun 1992.
|Survives
|- id="The Joel Brand Story"
|
|data-sort-value="Joel Brand Story"|The Joel Brand Story
|, based on the book by Alex Weissberg; adapted from German by Rudolph Cartier
|
|
|Cyril Shaps,Zia Mohyeddin,Anton Diffring,Martin Benson,Michael Godfrey,Harold Goldblatt,Pat Gorman,Gertan Klauber,Tutte Lemkow,Peter Howell
|Adapted from the book.
|Lost
|- id="Gordon of Khartoum"
|
|Gordon of Khartoum
| (play);David Benedictus (adaptation)
|
|
|Alan Badel,Charles Carson,John Franklyn-Robbins,Gladys Spencer,Cyril Shaps,Roy Stewart
|Adapted from the play The Last Hero.
|Lost
|- id="Where Angels Fear to Tread"
|
|Where Angels Fear to Tread
| (novel);Elizabeth Hart (adaptation)
|
|
|Anna Massey,Wendy Hiller,Alec McCowen,Nora Swinburne,André Lawrence
|Adapted from the novel.
|Lost
|- id="Lee Oswald - Assassin"
|
|Lee Oswald - Assassin
| (play);Rudolph Cartier &Reed De Rouen(adaptation)
|
|
|Tony Bill,Dora Reisser,Robert Ayres,John Alderson,Donald Sutherland,Callen Angelo,David Bauer,Glenn Beck,Reed De Rouen,Harold Goldblatt,David Graham,David Healy,Paul Maxwell,Warren Mitchell,Shane Rimmer,Tony Sibbald
|Adapted from the play.
|Survives
|- id="Make Me an Offer"
|
|Make Me an Offer
| (book);David Heneker & Monty Norman (m/ly)
|
|
|Diana Coupland,Peter Gilmore,Judith Bruce,Meier Tzelniker,James Grout,Ivor Salter,Patrick O'Connell,Timothy Bateson
|Adapted from the novel.
|Lost
|- id="Death of a Salesman"
|
|Death of a Salesman
|
|
|
|Rod Steiger,Betsy Blair,Joss Ackland,Tony Bill,Kenneth J. Warren,David Healy
|Adapted from the play.
|lost
|- id="The Devil's Eggshell"
|
|data-sort-value="Devil's Eggshell, The"|The Devil's Eggshell
|, based on an idea by Alex Comfort.
|
|
|Leonard Rossiter,Keith Barron,David Langton,John Phillips,Nicholas Pennell,Bernard Hepton,Burt Kwouk,Michael Culver,Stephanie Bidmead,Anthony Jacobs,Basil Moss,Peter Copley,Godfrey James
|
|Survives
|-
! colspan="8" data-sort-value="ZZ" |Series Two
|- id="Defection! The Case of Colonel Petrov"
|
|Defection! The Case of Colonel Petrov
|, based on the book by Michael Bialoguski.
|
|
|Nigel Stock,Lee Montague,Charles Tingwell,Jerome Willis,Colin Jeavons,James Bree,Willoughby Gray,George Roubicek,George Pastell,Walter Sparrow,Peter van Dissel
|Based on the book The Petrov Story.
|Survives
|- id="Days to Come"
|
|Days to Come
| (story);Ken Taylor (adaptation)
|
|
|Dinsdale Landen,Judi Dench,Bernard Archard,John Quentin,Michael Gough,Alan Rowe,Michael Brennan,Norman Mitchell,Richard Coe,Peter Birrel,Yvonne Antrobus,John Caesar,Geoffrey Cheshire,Martin King,Rex Robinson
|Adapted from the novella.
|Lost
|- id="Corridors of Power"
|
|Corridors of Power
| (novel); adapted by John Elliot
|
|
|Patrick Allen,Alec Clunes,William Mervyn,Sarah LawsonJoseph Furst,Tenniel Evans,John Tate,Martin Friend,Donald Pickering,Kenneth Waller,Michael Guest,Morris Perry,Andrew Lodge,Eric Elliott,Peter Thompson
|Adapted from the novel.
|Lost
|- id="The Making of Jericho"
|
|data-sort-value="Making of Jericho, The"|The Making of Jericho
|
|
|
|John Thaw,Neville Smith,Pauline Collins,Peter Jeffrey,Wendy Richard,Donald Gee,John Scott Martin,Reg Lever,Geoffrey Hughes
|
|Lost
|- id="The Cabinet Papers"
|
|data-sort-value="Cabinet Papers, The"|The Cabinet Papers
| (book);Anthony Steven (adaptation)
|
|
|Maxine Audley,Griffith Jones,Richard Leech,Gerald Sim,Richard Vernon,Llewellyn Rees,David Garth,John Bryans,Iréna Mayeska,Alan Haywood,John Baker
|Adapted from the book.
|Lost
|-
! colspan="8" data-sort-value="ZZ" |Series Three
|- id="Girls in Uniform"
|
|Girls in Uniform
| (play);Barbara Burnham (translation);Derek Ingrey (adaptation)
|
|
|Virginia McKenna,Sonia Dresdel,Rachel Kempson,Francesca Annis,Anna Calder-Marshall,Petra Markham,Jan Chappell,Sally Faulkner,Stephanie Bidmead
|Adapted from the play/film. Repeated 6 Jul 1969.
|Lost
|- id="The Moon and Sixpence"
|
|data-sort-value="Moon and Sixpence, The"|The Moon and Sixpence
| (novel);Clive Exton (adaptation)
|
|
|Charles Gray,Ronald Hines,Barry Justice,Sylvia Kay,Elisabeth Welch
|Adapted from the novel.
|Lost
|- id="Romeo and Juliet"
|
|Romeo and Juliet
|
|
|
|Hywel Bennett,Kika Markham,John Gielgud,Thora Hird,Michael Gambon,Ronald Pickup,Charles Kay,Edward Burnham,Stephanie Bidmead,Brian Badcoe,David Griffin,Michael Godfrey,Derrick Gilbert
|Adapted from the play.
|Survives
|- id="The Parachute"
|
|data-sort-value="Parachute, The"|The Parachute
|
|
|
|Alan Badel,Jill Bennett,John Osborne,Isabel Dean,Esmond Knight,Barry Jackson,Norman Jones,Royston Farrell,Stephen Whittaker,Drewe Henley,John J. Carney
|Repeated as The Wednesday Play 6 Aug 1969, on BBC2 1 Sep 1976 and 29 Nov 1980, and on BBC1 23 Jun 1988.
|Survives
|- id="Cyrano de Bergerac"
|
|Cyrano de Bergerac
|, translated by Brian Hooker
|
|
|Eric Porter,Peter Jeffrey,Suzanne Neve,Simon Brent,Jerome Willis,Harold Innocent,Michael Godfrey,Gertan Klauber,Joseph Greig,Steve Peters
|Adapted from the play.
|Lost
|- id="Ghosts"
|
|Ghosts
|, translated by Michael Meyer
|
|
|Celia Johnson,Tom Courtenay,Donald Wolfit,Fulton Mackay,Vickery Turner
|Adapted from the play.
|Lost
|- id="The Corn Is Green"
|
|data-sort-value="Corn Is Green, The"|The Corn Is Green
| (play);Harry Green (adaptation)
|
|
|Wendy Hiller,Ronald Fraser,Stephanie Bidmead,Glyn HoustonJohn Ogwen,Glyn Owen,Mona Bruce
|Adapted from the play
|Lost
|- id="The Tempest"
|
|data-sort-value="Tempest, The"|The Tempest
|
|
|
|Michael Redgrave,Keith Michell,Jonathan Dennis,Ronald Pickup,Tessa Wyatt,John Woodvine,Donald Eccles,James Cairncross,Llewellyn Rees
|Adapted from the play.
|Lost
|- id="The Old Ladies"
|
|data-sort-value="Old Ladies, The"|The Old Ladies
| (play);Hugh Walpole (source novel)
|
|
|Flora Robson,Athene Seyler,Katina Paxinou
|Adapted from the play of the novel.
|Lost
|- id="Man and Superman"
|
|Man and Superman
|
|
|
|Eric Porter,Maggie Smith,Adrienne Corri,Rachel Kempson,Cyril Luckham,Angharad Rees,Tony Selby,Godfrey Quigley
|Adapted from the play.
|seqexist
|- id="Hay Fever"
|
|Hay Fever
|
|
|
|Celia Johnson,Anna Massey,Richard Briers,Dennis Price,Charles Gray,Hazel Hughes,Ian McKellen,Vickery Turner,Lucy Fleming
|Adapted from the play. Repeated 3 Aug 1969.
|Lost
|-
! colspan="8" data-sort-value="ZZ" |Series Four
|- id="St. Joan"
|
|St. Joan
|
|
|
|Janet Suzman,Hugh Walters,Glyn Owen,Richard Hampton,Murray Melvin,John Bryans,Michael Craig,Maurice Denham,Glyn Owen,Ronald Pickup,Jack Watson,Philip Bond,Jerold Wells
|Adapted from the play. Repeated 8 Jun 1969.
|Lost
|- id="The Male Animal"
|
|data-sort-value="Male Animal, The"|The Male Animal
| and Elliott Nugent.
|
|
|Lee Montague,Anthony Perkins,Toby Robins,Alan Gifford,Jumoke Debayo,Christopher Benjamin
|Adapted from the play.
|Lost
|- id="The Seagull (1968)"
|
|data-sort-value="Seagull, The"|The Seagull
|, translated by George Calderon
|
|
|Pamela Brown,Robert Stephens,Gemma Jones,Robin Phillips,Niall MacGinnis,Michael Gambon
|Adapted from the play. First shown on BBC2 under Theatre 625, 27 Mar 1966.
|Survives
|- id="Waters of the Moon"
|
|Waters of the Moon
|
|
|
|Athene Seyler,Vivien Merchant,Kathleen Harrison,Michael Gwynn,Roland Culver,Margaret Leighton
|Adapted from the play.
|Lost
|- id="Mary, Queen of Scots"
|
|Mary, Queen of Scots
|, translated by Stephen Spender
|
|
|Virginia McKenna,Pamela Brown,Derek Godfrey,Peter Cellier,Fanny Rowe,Walter Fitzgerald,John Harvey,Bernard Hepton,Tony Steedman
|Adapted from the play Mary Stuart.
|Lost
|- id="Maigret at Bay"
|
|Maigret at Bay
| (novel);Donald Bull (adaptation)
|
|
|Rupert Davies,Helen Shingler,Neville Jason,Gillian Hills,Yootha Joyce,Clive Cazes,Tony Harwood,Geoffrey Morris,Martin Miller,Hans De Vries,Donald Pickering,Murray Evans,Kenneth Benda,Ann Tirard,Geoffrey Cheshire,Robin Scott
|Adapted from the novel Maigret se défend.
|Survives
|- id="Relatively Speaking"
|
|Relatively Speaking
|
|
|
|Celia Johnson,Donald Sinden,John Stride,Judy Cornwell,
|Adapted from the play.
|Lost
|- id="Julius Caesar"
|
|Julius Caesar
|
|
|
|Robert Stephens,Frank Finlay,Maurice Denham,Edward Woodward,Anthony Bate,Alan Rowe,Jon Rollason,John Alderton,John Abineri,Terence De Marney,Christopher Guard,Christopher Timothy,Trevor Martin,Brian Vaughan,Christopher Benjamin,Richard Coe,Christopher Denham,Christopher Timothy,Stuart Wilson,Andrew Johns,Duncan Preston
|Adapted from the play. Repeated 5 Jul 1970.
|Survives
|- id="An Ideal Husband"
|
|data-sort-value="Ideal Husband, An"|An Ideal Husband
|
|
|
|Jeremy Brett,Keith Michell,Margaret Leighton,Dinah Sheridan,Susan Hampshire,Penelope Lee,Erik Chitty
|Adapted from the play. Repeated 26 Jul 1970.
|Survives
|-
! colspan="8" data-sort-value="ZZ" |Series Five
|- id="The Heiress"
|
|data-sort-value="Heiress, The"|The Heiress
|Ruth and Augustus Goetz, from a novel by Henry James
|
|
|Vincent Price,Eileen Atkins,John Stride,Lally Bowers,Shirley Dixon,David Allister
|Adapted from the novel Washington Square.
|Lost
|- id="Charley's Aunt"
|
|Charley's Aunt
| (play);Richard Waring (adaptation)
|
|
|Danny La Rue,Ronnie Barker,Coral Browne,Dinsdale Landen,John Standing,Robert Coote,Royce Mills,Reginald Barratt,George Giles
|Adapted from the play. Co-production between the BBC and Keep Films. Repeated 30 Aug 1970.
|Survives
|- id="The Marquise"
|
|data-sort-value="Marquise, The"|The Marquise
|
|
|
|Celia Johnson,Philip Latham,Richard Vernon,David Griffin,Ciaran Madden,Nigel Terry,Wensley Pithey
|Adapted from the play.
|Lost
|- id="Three Sisters"
|
|Three Sisters
|, translated by Elisaveta Fen
|
|
|Eileen Atkins,Janet Suzman,Michele Dotrice,Anthony Hopkins,Sarah Badel,Ronald Hines,Joss Ackland,Donald Pickering,Michael Bryant,Jill Bennett,Erik Chitty,Christopher Timothy
|Adapted from the play. Repeated 22 Aug 1971.
|Survives
|- id="In Good King Charles's Golden Days"
|
|In Good King Charles's Golden Days
|
|
|
|John Gielgud,Michael Craig,Maurice Denham,Derek Godfrey,Joan Greenwood,Felicity Hain,Barbara Jefford,Corin Redgrave,Joyce Redman,Athene Seyler,Elisabeth Bergner
|Adapted from the play. Repeated 25 Jul 1971.
|Lost
|- id="Separate Tables"
|
|Separate Tables
| (play);Hugh Whitemore (adaptation)
|
|
|Eric Porter,Annette Crosbie,Geraldine McEwan,Robert Harris,Cathleen Nesbitt,Hazel Hughes
|Adapted from the plays.
|Survives
|- id="Howards End"
|
|Howards End
|, adapted by Pauline MacAulay
|
|
|Leo Genn,Rachel Kempson,Glenda Jackson,Andrew Ray,Geraldine Sherman,Christopher Gable,Tessa Shaw,Daphne Heard,Mary Healey,John Tordoff,Caroline Hunt
|Adapted from the novel. Repeated on BBC2 2 Dec 1970.
|seqexist
|- id="The Rivals"
|
|data-sort-value="Rivals, The"|The Rivals
|
|
|
|Andrew Cruickshank,Beryl Reid,Jeremy Brett,Jennie Linden,John Alderton,T. P. McKenna,Susan Penhaligon,Lynn Farleigh
|Adapted from the play.
|Survives
|-
! colspan="8" data-sort-value="ZZ" |Series Six
|- id="Macbeth"
|
|Macbeth
|
|
|
|Eric Porter,Janet Suzman,John Thaw,John Woodvine,John Alderton,Michael Goodliffe,Tony Caunter,Sylvia Coleridge,Daphne Heard,Hilary Mason,Geoffrey Palmer,Wolfe Morris,Alan Rowe,Donald Douglas,John Bailey,David Spenser,Leon Eagles,Christopher GuardPaul Greenhalgh
|Adapted from the play. Repeated 20 Jun 1971.
|Survives
|- id="Ross"
|
|Ross
| (play);William Emms (adaptation)
|
|
|Ian McKellen,Charles Gray,Barrie Ingham,John Bennett,Martin Jarvis,Edward Fox,Brian Rawlinson,Michael Robbins,David Spenser,Kim Fortune,Hugh Walters,Simon Lack,Robert Luckham,Victor Pemberton,David Griffin,Richard Hampton
|Adapted from the play. Repeated on BBC2 under Stage 2, 28 Jul 1971.
|Lost
|- id="Uncle Vanya"
|
|Uncle Vanya
|, translated by Elisaveta Fen
|
|
|Freddie Jones,Anthony Hopkins,Ann Bell,Roland Culver,Jenifer Armitage,John Baskcomb,Richard Beale,Stacey Tendeter
|Adapted from the play. Repeated on BBC2 under Stage 2, 11 Aug 1971.
|Survives
|- id="Five Finger Exercise"
|
|Five Finger Exercise
|
|
|
|Margaret Lockwood,Paul Rogers,Gary Bond,Sally Thomsett,Timothy Dalton
|Adapted from the play.
|Lost
|- id="Act of Betrayal"
|
|Act of Betrayal
|
|
|
|Zena Walker,Mary Wimbush,Michael Gwynn,Stanley Meadows,Deborah Lavin,Alan MacNaughtan,Gertan Klauber,Nicholas Smith,Jay Neill
|Repeated 23 Mar 1972.
|Survives
|- id="Candida"
|
|Candida
|
|
|
|George Baker,Jeremy Bulloch,Timothy Dalton,Geraldine McEwan,Clive Revill
|Adapted from the play. Repeated on BBC2 under Stage 2, 14 Jul 1971.
|Lost
|- id="The Wild Duck"
|
|data-sort-value="Wild Duck, The"|The Wild Duck
| (play);Max Faber (adaptation)
|
|
|Denholm Elliott,Derek Godfrey,Mark Dignam,Rosemary Leach,John Robinson,Jenny Agutter,Stephanie Bidmead,Christopher Benjamin,Brian Vaughan
|Adapted from the play. Repeated 19 Mar 1972.
|Survives
|- id="Don Juan in Hell"
|
|Don Juan in Hell
|
|
|
|Michael Hordern,Christopher Plummer,Michael Redgrave,Vivien Merchant
|Adapted from the play.
|Lost
|- id="Platonov"
|
|Platonov
|, translated by Dmitri Makaroff, adapted by John Elliot
|
|
|Rex Harrison,Patsy Byrne,Siân Phillips,Clive Revill,Donald Eccles,Geoffrey Bayldon,Willoughby Goddard,Stacey Tendeter,John Gill,Kevin Stoney,Neil McCarthy
|Adapted from the play. Repeated 8 Mar 1973.
|Survives
|-
! colspan="8" data-sort-value="ZZ" |Series Seven
|- id="A Midsummer Night's Dream"
|
|data-sort-value="Midsummer Night's Dream, A"|A Midsummer Night's Dream
|
|
|
|Eileen Atkins,Robert Stephens,Lynn Redgrave,Amanda Barrie,Jeremy Clyde,Edward Fox,Michael Gambon,Eleanor Bron,Ronnie Barker,Paul Henry,John Laurie,Clifford Rose,John Glyn-Jones,Pam Ferris,Ken Parry
|Adapted from the play. Repeated on BBC2 7 Aug 1973.
|Survives
|- id="Rasputin"
|
|Rasputin
|
|
|
|Robert Stephens,Peter Barkworth,Isabel Dean,Jonathan Moore,Lally Bowers,T. P. McKenna,Andrew Robertson,Reg Lye,Leonard Trolley,Derrick Gilbert,John Savident,James Bree,Harry Waters
|Adapted from the play. Repeated on BBC2 under Stage 2, 17 Oct 1972.
|Survives
|- id="Tartuffe"
|
|Tartuffe
|Molière (play)Richard Wilbur (translator/adaption)
|
|
|Michael Hordern,Michael Craig,John Standing,David Nettheim,Mary Morris,Patricia Routledge
|Adapted from the play. Repeated on BBC2 9 Oct 1973.
|Lost
|- id="The Cherry Orchard"
|
|data-sort-value="Cherry Orchard, The"|The Cherry Orchard
|, translated by Elisaveta Fen
|
|
|Celia Johnson,Edward Woodward,Jenny Agutter,Ray Brooks,Christopher Gable,Gemma Jones,Cyril Shaps,David Spenser,Mary Wimbush
|Adapted from the play. Repeated on BBC2 under Stage 2, 24 Oct 1972.
|bw 16mmtr only
|- id="Summer and Smoke"
|
|Summer and Smoke
|
|
|
|Lee Remick,David Hedison,Barry Morse,Betsy Blair,Wendy Miller,Bruce Clark
|Adapted from the play.
|Lost
|- id="Stephen D"
|
|Stephen D
|, adapted by Hugh Leonard
|
|
|Donal McCann,James Aspinall,Pamela Duncan,Martin Dempsey,Pauline Delaney,David Kelly,Aidan Murphy,Brendan Price,Brenda Fricker
|Adapted from A Portrait of the Artist as a Young Man and Stephen Hero. Repeated on BBC2 under Stage 2, 31 Oct 1972.
|Survives
|- id="The Merchant of Venice"
|
|data-sort-value="Merchant of Venice, The"|The Merchant of Venice
|
|
|
|Maggie Smith,Frank Finlay,Charles Gray,Christopher Gable,Robert Harris,Malcolm Stoddard,Nerys Hughes,David Spenser,John Moffatt,Alan Tucker,Ken Parry
|Adapted from the play.
|Survives
|- id="Lady Windermere's Fan"
|
|Lady Windermere's Fan
|
|
|
|Coral Browne,Judy Geeson,Liza Goddard,Derek Godfrey,Charles Gray,James Villiers,Judy Geeson,Siân Phillips
|Adapted from the play.
|Lost
|- id="The Playboy of the Western World"
|
|data-sort-value="Playboy of the Western World, The"|The Playboy of the Western World
|
|
|
|John Hurt,Sinéad Cusack,Pauline Delany,Joe Lynch,Kevin Flood,Gerard Murphy
|Adapted from the play. First shown on BBC2 under Stage 2, 21 Jul 1971.
|Survives
|- id="She Stoops to Conquer"
|
|She Stoops to Conquer
|
|
|
|Tom Courtenay,Thora Hird,Juliet Mills,Ralph Richardson,Elaine Taylor,Terry Bale,Esmond Knight,Geoffrey Bateman
|Adapted from the play. First shown on BBC2 under Stage 2, 4 Aug 1971.
|Survives
|- id="Trelawny of the 'Wells'"
|
|Trelawny of the 'Wells'''
|
|
|
|John Alderton,Graham Crowden,Lally Bowers,Roland Culver,Ian Ogilvy,Anthony Ainley,Lila Kaye,John Dearth,John Cater,Godfrey James,Stephanie Turner,Henry Woolf
|Adapted from the play. First shown on BBC2 under Stage 2, 7 Jul 1971.
|Survives
|-
! colspan="8" data-sort-value="ZZ" |Series Eight
|- id="The Millionairess"
|
|data-sort-value="Millionairess, The"|The Millionairess|
|
|
|Maggie Smith,James Villiers,Peter Barkworth,Charles Gray,Tom Baker,Priscilla Morgan,Avril Angers,John Garrie,Donald Pickering
|Adapted from the play. Repeated 13 Jun 1973.
|SurvivesThe Bernard Shaw Collection, BBC 6 DVD box set
|- id="Hedda Gabler"
|
|Hedda Gabler|, translated by Michael Meyer
|
|
|Janet Suzman,Ian McKellen,Jane Asher,Brendan Barry,Dorothy Reynolds,Tom Bell
|Adapted from the play. Repeated 14 Jul 1974 and on BBC2 5 Nov 1986.
|Survives
|- id="King Oedipus"
|
|King Oedipus|Sophocles, translated by E. F. Watling
|
|
|Ian Holm,Sheila Allen,Alan Webb,Anthony Bate,Sydney Tafler,George Coulouris,Edward Kelsey,Alan Rowe,Ahmed Khalil,Philip Ryan,Sidney Kean
|Adapted from the play Oedipus Rex. Repeated on BBC2 2 Jul 1974.
|Survives
|- id="The Magistrate"
|
|data-sort-value="Magistrate, The"|The Magistrate|
|
|
|Michael Hordern,Geraldine McEwan,Peter Firth,Leonard Rossiter,Anna Calder-Marshall,Barrie Ingham,Jan Francis,Dudley Jones
|Adapted from the play. Repeated 9 Jun 1974.
|Lost
|- id="The Adventures of Don Quixote"
|
|data-sort-value="Adventures of Don Quixote, The"|The Adventures of Don Quixote| (novel);Hugh Whitemore (adaptation)
|
|
|Rex Harrison,Frank Finlay,Rosemary Leach,Bernard Hepton,Ronald Lacey,Roger Delgado,Robert Eddison,Paul Whitsun-Jones,John Hollis,Walter Sparrow
|Adapted from the novel. Co-production between the BBC and Universal Pictures Television.
|Survives
|- id="Candide"
|
|Candide|Voltaire, translated and adapted by James MacTaggart
|
|
|Frank Finlay,Ian Ogilvy,Emrys James,Clifton Jones,Angela Richards,Kathleen Helme,Leonard Maguire,Jerome Willis,John Woodnutt,Johnnie Wade
|Adapted from the novel. Repeated on BBC2 19 Mar 1974.
|Survives
|- id="A Room with a View"
|
|data-sort-value="Room with a View, A"|A Room with a View| (novel);Pauline MacAulay (adaptation)
|
|
|Judy Geeson,Charles Gray,Tom Chadbon,John Sharp,Robert Coote,Lally Bowers,Michael Guest
|Adapted from the novel. Repeated on BBC2 16 Jul 1974.
|seqexist
|- id="The Caucasian Chalk Circle"
|
|data-sort-value="Caucasian Chalk Circle, The"|The Caucasian Chalk Circle|, translated by Eric Bentley
|
|
|Leo McKern,Sara Kestelman,Fanny Carby,Donald Gee,Peter Halliday,Terence Hardiman,Bernard Hepton,Peter Jeffrey,Patrick Magee,Declan Mulholland,James Mellor,Edmund Pegge,Robert Powell,John Thaw,Linda Thorson
|Adapted from the play.
|Lost
|- id="The Duchess of Malfi"
|
|data-sort-value="Duchess of Malfi, The"|The Duchess of Malfi|
|
|
|Eileen Atkins,Michael Bryant,Charles Kay,T. P. McKenna,Gary Bond,Jerome Willis,Michael Godfrey,Robert James,Roy Evans,Michael Lynch,Talfryn Thomas,Tim Curry,Nick Brimble,Jack Galloway,Dallas Cavell,Peter Spraggon
|Adapted from the play. First shown on BBC2 under Stage 2, 10 Oct 1972.
|Survives
|- id="Peer Gynt"
|
|Peer Gynt|, English version by Norman Ginsbury
|
|
|Colin Blakely,Wendy Hiller,Francesca Annis,Ray Barrett,Aubrey Morris,Lois Baxter,Dudley Foster,John Franklyn-Robbins,Terence Bayler,Helen Blatch,Claire Davenport,Elroy Josephs,Andrew Lane,Mark McManus
|Adapted from the play. First shown on BBC2 under Stage 2, 26 Sep 1972.
|Survives
|-
! colspan="8" data-sort-value="ZZ" |Series Nine
|- id="The Love-Girl and the Innocent"
|
|data-sort-value="Love-Girl and the Innocent, The"|The Love-Girl and the Innocent|, translated by Nicholas Bethell and David Burg
|
|
|David Leland,Gabrielle Lloyd,Richard Durden,Patrick Stewart,Allan Surtees,Barry Jackson,John Kane,Alan Gerrard,Forbes Collins,Reg Pritchard,Eric Mason,Edwin Finn,John Herrington,George Cormack,Trevor Lawrence,Carl Forgione,Brian Grellis
|Adapted from the play. Repeated 11 Aug 1974.
|Survives
|- id="The Common"
|
|data-sort-value="Common, The"|The Common|
|
|
|Vivien Merchant,Peter Jeffrey,Dennis Waterman,Gwen Taylor,Shelagh Fraser,Trevor Baxter,Tony Sibbald
|Repeated 8 Jun 1975.
|Survives
|- id="The Recruiting Officer"
|
|data-sort-value="Recruiting Officer, The"|The Recruiting Officer|
|
|
|Ian McKellen,Prunella Ransome,Jane Asher,Brian Blessed,Bryan Marshall,John Moffatt,John Welsh,John Flint,Charles Gray,Eileen Helsby,Mitzi McKenzie,Graham Weston
|Adapted from the play.
|seqexist
|- id="Pygmalion"
|
|Pygmalion|
|
|
|James Villiers,Lynn Redgrave,Ronald Fraser,Emrys James,Lally Bowers,Angela Baddeley,Jon Rollason,Sheila Grant,John Cannon
|Adapted from the play.
|Survives
|- id="The Changeling"
|
|data-sort-value="Changeling, The"|The Changeling| &William Rowley
|
|
|Stanley Baker,Helen Mirren,Brian Cox,Alan Webb,T.P. McKenna,Frances Tomelty,Tony Selby,Susan Penhaligon,Christopher Saul
|Adapted from the play.
|Survives
|- id="The Importance of Being Earnest"
|
|data-sort-value="Importance of Being Earnest, The"|The Importance of Being Earnest|
|
|
|Michael Jayston,Julian Holloway,Gemma Jones,Celia Bannerman,Coral Browne,Lally Bowers,Richard Pearson,Arthur Hewlett
|Adapted from the play.
|Survives
|- id="The Deep Blue Sea"
|
|data-sort-value="Deep Blue Sea, The"|The Deep Blue Sea|
|
|
|Virginia McKenna,Peter Egan,Stephen Murray,Vladek Sheybal,Joseph Blatchley,John Moffatt,Jon Croft
|Adapted from the play. Repeated 27 Jul 1975.
|Lost
|- id="Mrs Warren's Profession"
|
|Mrs Warren's Profession|
|
|
|Coral Browne,Penelope Wilton,Robert Powell,James Grout,Richard Pearson
|Adapted from the play. First shown on BBC2 under Stage 2, 3 Oct 1972.
|Survives
|- id="The Skin Game"
|
|data-sort-value="Skin Game, The"|The Skin Game|
|
|
|Paul Rogers,Barbara Jefford,Bernard Lee,Judy Geeson,John Collin,Kate Nicholls,Simon MacCorkindale,David Garfield,Edward Evans
|Adapted from the play.
|Survives
|-
! colspan="8" data-sort-value="ZZ" |Series Ten
|- id="The Linden Tree"
|
|data-sort-value="Linden Tree, The"|The Linden Tree|
|
|
|Andrew Cruikshank,Margaret Tyzack,Gary Bond,Joanna Van Gyseghem,Marilyn Taylerson,Simon Lack,Michael Craze
|Adapted from the play. Repeated 15 Aug 1976.
|Survives
|- id="Electra"
|
|Electra|Sophocles, translated by E. F. Watling
|
|
|Eileen Atkins,Rosalie Crutchley,Julian Glover,Derek Godfrey,Georgina Hale,Susan Richards,Martin Shaw
|Adapted from the play. Repeated on BBC2 15 Sep 1976.
|Survives
|- id="The Wood Demon"
|
|data-sort-value="Wood Demon, The"|The Wood Demon|, translated by Ronald Hingley
|
|
|Ian Holm,Francesca AnnisRonald Hines,Ronald Fraser,Donal McCann,Angela Pleasence,Cyril Luckham,Geoffrey Bayldon,Vickery Turner,Daphne Heard,Jay Neill
|Adapted from the play.
|Survives
|- id="Robinson Crusoe"
|
|Robinson Crusoe| (novel);James MacTaggart (adaptation)
|
|
|Stanley Baker,Ram John Holder,Jerome Willis
|Adapted from the novel.
|Survives
|- id="The Apple Cart"
|
|data-sort-value="Apple Cart, The"|The Apple Cart|
|
|
|Nigel Davenport,Helen Mirren,Peter Barkworth,Bill Fraser,Trevor Baxter,Beryl Reid,Reg Pritchard,Simon Lack
|Adapted from the play.
|Survives
|- id="The School for Scandal"
|
|data-sort-value="School for Scandal, The"|The School for Scandal|
|
|
|Jeremy Brett,Pauline Collins,Edward Fox,Bernard Lee,Arthur Lowe,Andrew Robertson,Colin Jeavons,Russell Hunter,John Rhys-Davies,Richard Kane,David Kincaid,Willie Shearer
|Adapted from the play.
|Survives
|- id="King Lear"
|
|King Lear|
|
|
|Michael Hordern,Sarah Badel,Angela Down,Donald Gee,Michael Jayston,Frank Middlemass,Anthony Nicholls,Ronald Pickup,Penelope Wilton,Benjamin Whitrow,Glen Murphy,David Neal,Alec Sabin,David Kincaid,Terry Wright
|Adapted from the play. Repeated on BBC2 9 Mar 1977.
|Survives
|- id="The Shadow of a Gunman"
|
|data-sort-value="Shadow of a Gunman, The"|The Shadow of a Gunman|
|
|
|Hilary Minster,Mark Moss,Phyllis McMahon,Isolde Cazelet,Michael O'Donoughue,Keith Steven
|Adapted from the play. First shown on BBC2 under Stage 2, 25 Sep 1973.
|Lost
|- id="Strife"
|
|Strife|
|
|
|Colin Blakely,Clifford Evans,Angela Down,Nerys Hughes,Trevor Cooper,John Bennett,Mostyn Evans,Hayden Jones,John Ogwen,Aubrey Richards,Clifford Rose,Hugh Walters,George Waring
|Adapted from the play.
|Survives
|-
! colspan="8" data-sort-value="ZZ" |Series Eleven
|- id="Chips with Everything"
|
|Chips with Everything|
|
|
|David Daker,Lloyd McGuire,Terence Budd,Tim Woodward,Karl Johnson,Donald Hewlett,David Troughton,Terry Bale,Leslie Schofield
|Adapted from the play.
|Survives
|- id="The Little Minister"
|
|data-sort-value="Little Minister, The"|The Little Minister|
|
|
|Ian Ogilvy,Helen Mirren,Peter Barkworth,Bill Simpson,Anne Kristen,Nicholas Jones,David Bailie,John Moffatt,Simon Lack,Robert James
|Adapted from the play.
|Survives
|- id="Love's Labour's Lost"
|
|Love's Labour's Lost|
|
|
|Martin Shaw,David Gwillim,Martin C. Thurley,Jeremy Brett,James Berwick,Terence Budd,Maurice Denham,Andrew Harding,Victoria Plucknett,Lorna Heilbron,Clifford Rose,Jan Francis,Tony Haygarth,Hugh Ross,David Bailie
|Adapted from the play.
|Survives
|- id="When We Are Married"
|
|When We Are Married|
|
|
|Stuart Wilson,John Stratton,Beryl Reid,Eric Porter,Patricia Routledge,Richard Pearson,Thora Hird,Mel Martin,Kenneth Waller,Ronnie Barker,Sheila Reid
|Adapted from the play.
|Survives
|- id="Trilby"
|
|Trilby| (novel);Hugh Whitemore (adaptation)
|
|
|Alan Badel,Sinéad Cusack,Stuart Fox,Michael Anthony,Rosalie Crutchley,Bruce Purchase,Chris Gannon
|Adapted from the novel. Repeated on BBC2 14 Sep 1977.
|Survives
|- id="Loyalties"
|
|Loyalties|
|
|
|Edward Fox,Charles Gray,Polly Adams,John Carson,Peter Dyneley,Dinah Sheridan,Erik Chitty,Roger Hammond,Pat Gorman,Andrew Lane,Steve Plytas,Geoffrey Palmer
|Adapted from the play.
|Survives
|- id="The Chester Mystery Plays"
|
|data-sort-value="Chester Mystery Plays, The"|The Chester Mystery Plays| (adaptation)
|
|
|Tom Courtenay,Michael Hordern,Alun Armstrong,Hilda Braid,Keith Chegwin,Kenneth Colley,Paul Copley,Christopher Guard,Brian Glover,Tony Haygarth,David Jackson,Kevin McNally,John Normington,Terry Scully,Nina Thomas,Raymond Westwell
|Adapted from the cycle of Chester Mystery Plays. Repeated 7 Aug - 11 Sep 1977.
|Survives
|- id="French Without Tears"
|
|French Without Tears|
|
|
|Nigel Havers,David Robb,Anthony Andrews,Barbara KellermanVernon Dobtcheff,Michael Gambon,Nicola Pagett
|Adapted from the play.
|Survives
|-
! colspan="8" data-sort-value="ZZ" |Series Twelve
|- id="The Picture of Dorian Gray"
|
|data-sort-value="Picture of Dorian Gray, The"|The Picture of Dorian Gray|John Osborne (play adaptation)
|
|
|John Gielgud,Peter Firth,Mark Dignam,Jeremy Brett,Nan Munro,Gwen Ffrangcon-Davies,Michael Barrington,Judi Bowker,Nicholas Ball,Lawrence Davidson,Reginald Barratt,Paul Greenhalgh
|Adapted from the novel.
|Survives
|- id="London Assurance"
|
|London Assurance| (play)Gerald Savory (adaptation)
|
|
|Anthony Andrews,Judy Cornwell,Jan Francis,Charles Gray,Dinsdale Landen,Clifford Rose,Nigel Stock,James Bree,George Raistrick,Nat Pearn
|Adapted from the play.
|Survives
|- id="Look Back in Anger"
|
|Look Back in Anger|
|
|
|James Hazeldine,Ciaran Madden,Neil Daglish,Chrissy Iddon,Thorley Walters
|Adapted from the play.
|Survives
|- id="The Winslow Boy"
|
|data-sort-value="Winslow Boy, The"|The Winslow Boy|
|
|
|Jonathan Scott-Taylor,Simon Chandler,Ann Beach,Eric Porter,Diana FairfaxMichele Dotrice,Kenneth Waller
|Adapted from the play. Repeated on BBC2 10 May 1978.
|Survives
|- id="The Country Wife"
|
|data-sort-value="Country Wife, The"|The Country Wife|
|
|
|Helen Mirren,Bernard Cribbins,Anthony Andrews,Amanda Barrie,Adrienne Corri,Ciaran Madden,John Nettleton,Michael Cochrane,Phil Daniels
|Adapted from the play.
|Survives
|- id="The Ambassadors"
|
|data-sort-value="Ambassadors, The"|The Ambassadors|, dramatised by Denis Constanduros
|
|
|Paul Scofield,Lee Remick,Delphine Seyrig,David Huffman,Gayle Hunnicutt,Don Fellows,William Hootkins
|Adapted from the novel.
|Survives
|- id="Heartbreak House"
|
|Heartbreak House|
|
|
|John Gielgud,Siân Phillips,Barbara Murray,Daniel Massey,Lesley-Anne Down,David Waller,Donald Pickering,Barry Jackson
|Adapted from the play.
|Survives
|-
! colspan="8" data-sort-value="ZZ" |Series Thirteen
|- id="You Never Can Tell"
|
|You Never Can Tell|
|
|
|Robert Powell,Kika Markham,Ernest Clark,Warren Clarke,Cyril Cusack,Patrick Magee,Judy Parfitt,Kate Nicholls
|Adapted from the play.
|Survives
|- id="Waste"
|
|Waste|
|
|
|Paul Daneman,Hannah Gordon,Joyce Carey,Heather Chasen,Annette Crosbie,Robert Lang,André Morell,Stephen Murray,Donald Pickering,Alan Rowe,Michael Cashman
|Adapted from the play.
|Survives
|- id="Flint"
|
|Flint|
|
|
|John Le Mesurier,Julie Covington,Peter Bowles,Dandy Nichols,Beryl Reid,Philip Stone,John Bailey
|Adapted from the play.
|Survives
|- id="The Seagull (1978)"
|
|data-sort-value="Seagull, The"|The Seagull|, translated by Ronald Hingley
|
|
|Anthony Bate,Zoe Caldwell,Michael Gambon,Georgina Hale,Stephen Rea,Julia Schofield,Alan Webb,John Kane,Allan Surtees
|Adapted from the play.
|Survives
|- id="The Sea"
|
|data-sort-value="Sea, The"|The Sea|
|
|
|Judy Campbell,Mark Dignam,Victor Spinetti
|Adapted from the play.
|Survives
|- id="The Beaux' Stratagem"
|
|data-sort-value="Beaux' Stratagem, The"|The Beaux' Stratagem|
|
|
|Brenda Bruce,Tom Conti,Estelle Kohler,Ian Ogilvy,David Waller,Julie Peasgood,Jay Neill,Zoë Wanamaker,Malcolm Terris,Tony Haygarth,Freddie Jones,Souad Faress,Norman Rodway,Ray Callaghan
|Adapted from the play.
|Survives
|- id="Danton's Death"
|
|Danton's Death| (play)Alan Clarke &Stuart Griffiths (adaptation)
|
|
|Norman Rodway,Ian Richardson,Peter Gordon,Katherine Fahey,Felicity Gibson,Don Henderson,Michael Bilton,Nigel Lambert,Michael Pennington,John Woodnutt,Zoë Wanamaker
|Adapted from the play.
|Survives
|-
! colspan="8" data-sort-value="ZZ" |Series Fourteen
|- id="Kean"
|
|Kean|, translated by Frank Hauser.
|
|
|Anthony Hopkins,Neville PhillipsSara Kestelman,Adrienne Corri,Barrie Ingham,Robert Stephens,Frank Middlemass,Cherie Lunghi,Hugh Walters,George Tovey,Harry Fielder
|Adapted from Sartre's play about Edmund Kean.
|Survives
|- id="Marya"
|
|Marya|, translated by Michael Glenny and Harold Shckman, adapted by Christopher Hampton
|
|
|Trevor Peacock,Paddy Joyce,Clive Revill,Niall Padden,Michael Byrne,Lisa Harrow,Paul Rogers,Susan Tracy,Paul Freeman
|Adapted from the play.
|Survives
|- id="The Voysey Inheritance"
|
|data-sort-value="Voysey Inheritance, The"|The Voysey Inheritance|
|
|
|Jeremy Irons,Brewster Mason,Jeremy Child,Julie Covington,Dulcie Gray,Barbara Leigh-Hunt
|Adapted from the play.
|Survives
|- id="Hello and Goodbye"
|
|Hello and Goodbye|
|
|
|Yvonne Bryceland,Bill Flynn
|Adapted from the play.
|Survives
|- id="The Wings of the Dove"
|
|data-sort-value="Wings of the Dove, The"|The Wings of the Dove| (novel);Denis Constanduros (adaptation)
|
|
|Elizabeth Spriggs,Betsy Blair,John Castle,Suzanne Bertish,Lisa Eichhorn,Rupert Frazer,Alan Rowe,Gino Melvazzi
|Adapted from the novel.
|Survives
|- id="Design for Living"
|
|Design for Living|
|
|
|Rula Lenska,Clive Arrindell,John Steiner,John Bluthal,Dandy Nichols
|Adapted from the play.
|Survives
|- id="The Kitchen"
|
|data-sort-value="Kitchen, The"|The Kitchen|
|
|
|Peter Egan
|Adapted from the play. First shown on BBC2 under Play of the Week, 2 Nov 1977.
|Survives
|-
! colspan="8" data-sort-value="ZZ" |Series Fifteen
|- id="I Have Been Here Before"
|
|I Have Been Here Before|
|
|
|Herbert Lom,Anthony Valentine,Lorna Heilbron,Leslie Sands,James Griffiths
|Adapted from the play.
|Survives
|- id="On Approval"
|
|On Approval|
|
|
|Penelope Keith,Jeremy Brett,Lindsay Duncan,Benjamin Whitrow
|Adapted from the play. First shown 27 Dec 1980.
|Survives
|- id="Little Eyolf"
|
|Little Eyolf|, translated by Michael Meyer
|
|
|Anthony Hopkins,Diana Rigg,Peggy Ashcroft,Emma Piper,Charles Dance,Timothy Stark
|Adapted from the play.
|SurvivesDiana Rigg at the BBC, BBC-Warner DVD box-set (Region 1 only)
|- id="The Critic"
|
|data-sort-value="Critic, The"|The Critic| (play);Don Taylor (additional dialogue)
|
|
|John Gielgud,Hywel Bennett,Nigel Hawthorne,Rosemary Leach,Norman Rodway,Alan Badel,Anna Massey,Rodney Bewes,Christopher Biggins
|Adapted from the play.
|Survives
|- id="The White Guard"
|
|data-sort-value="White Guard, The"|The White Guard|, translated by Michael Glenny
|
|
|Michael Pennington,Laura Davenport,Nigel Havers,Charles Keating,John Shrapnel,Charles Kay,Gordon Gostelow,Michael Graham Cox,Michael N. Harbour,Martin Clunes,Glen Murphy,John Ringham,Oliver Smith,Walter Sparrow,John Abineri,Andrew Burt,Geoffrey Beevers
|Adapted from the novel.
|Survives
|-
! colspan="8" data-sort-value="ZZ" |Series Sixteen
|- id="Dangerous Corner"
|
|Dangerous Corner|
|
|
|Anthony Valentine,Sarah Badel,David Robb,Judi Bowker,Daniel Day-Lewis,Elvi Hale,Susan Fleetwood
|Adapted from the play.
|Survives
|- id="The Gay Lord Quex]"
|
|data-sort-value="Gay Lord Quex, The"|The Gay Lord Quex|
|
|
|Hannah Gordon,Evelyn Laye,Rosalind Ayres,Julian Holloway,Lucy Gutteridge,Anton Rodgers,Geraldine Alexander
|Adapted from the play.
|Survives
|- id="The Misanthrope"
|
|data-sort-value="Misanthrope, The"|The Misanthrope|Molière
|
|
|Ian Holm,Cherie Lunghi,Nigel Hawthorne,Annette Crosbie,Michael Kitchen
|Adapted from the play. First shown on BBC1 under Festival, 27 Jan 1980.
|Survives
|- id="Infidelities"
|
|Infidelities|, translated by David Cohen
|
|
|Charlotte Rampling,Robin Askwith,Victor Spinetti,James Aubrey,Leonie Mellinger
|Adapted from the play Double Inconstancy|Survives
|}

See also
Other BBC drama anthology series include:
 Theatre 625 The Wednesday Play Thirty-Minute Theatre Play for Today Stage 2 BBC2 Playhouse''

References

External links
 
 

 
1965 British television series debuts
1983 British television series endings
BBC television dramas
Lost BBC episodes
Television series by BBC Studios
1960s British drama television series
1970s British drama television series
1980s British drama television series
1960s British anthology television series
1970s British anthology television series
1980s British anthology television series